Turan (also Romanized as Ţūrān and Tūrān) is a village in Barzavand Rural District, in the Central District of Ardestan County, Isfahan Province, Iran. At the 2006 census, its population was 21, in 14 families.

References 

Populated places in Ardestan County